Indian classical dance or Shastriya Nritya is an umbrella term for various performance arts rooted in Hindu musical theatre styles, whose theory and practice can be traced to the Sanskrit text Natya Shastra.
The number of classical dances range from eight to more, depending on the source and scholar. The Sangeet Natak Academy recognizes eight – Bharatanatyam, Kathak, Kuchipudi, Odissi, Kathakali, Sattriya, Manipuri and Mohiniyattam. Scholars such as Drid Williams add Chhau, Yakshagana and Bhagavata Mela to the list. Additionally, the Indian Ministry of Culture includes Chhau in its classical list. These dances are traditionally regional. They consist of compositions in Hindi, Malayalam, Meitei (Manipuri), Sanskrit, Tamil, Odia, Telugu, or any other Indian language and they represent a unity of core ideas in a diversity of styles, costumes and expression. Currently, there are 9 official classical dances in India.

Summary 

Indian classical dancing started around 200 BCE in India. 
Indian classical dancing is a very joyful and celebratory thing for people to do in the Indian culture. The style of Indian classical dancing is very vibrant and motivational. It is a style of dance that is like a communication with the gods. Indian classical dancing usually happens at festivals and cultural events. The dancers who perform this kind of dance usually is a professional dancer that has had a lot of practice in that specific style of Indian classical dancing. In Indian classical dancing the professional dancers usually dance to beat of the song or sound that is playing. They move their body to rhythm of the music and they flow. The movement and coordination usually sync up with whatever sound or song they are listening to. The dancer takes the role of the character that they hear in the song or sound and become emotionally connected with the story and the audience.

When dancers perform classical Indian dancing they wear traditional clothes including sarees, lenghas, and kurtas. Usually women are the people performing Indian classical dancing. The costume consists of a long colorful material with a beautiful pattern on it, wrapped around her body, she usually wears a lot of jewellery like necklaces, hand bracelet and leg bracelets the female also wears a head ornamental piece, she usually has a lot of makeup applied to her to make her seem vibrant and attract attention from the crowd, and her outfit is usually custom made by hand. The costume will have a special design on it that consists of many beads and other spectacular designed things attached to the costume. The female wears foot shakers which jingles as she dances.

Types of classical dances 
The Natya Shastra is the foundational treatise for classical dances of India, and this text is attributed to the ancient scholar Bharata Muni. Its first complete compilation is dated to between 200 BCE and 200 CE, but estimates vary between 500 BCE and 500 CE. The most studied version of the Natya Shastra text consists of about 6000 verses structured into 36 chapters. The text, states Natalia Lidova, describes the theory of Tāṇḍava dance (Shiva), the theory of rasa, of bhāva, expression, gestures, acting techniques, basic steps, standing postures – all of which are part of Indian classical dances. Dance and performance arts, states this ancient text, are a form of expression of spiritual ideas, virtues and the essence of scriptures.

While the Natya Shastra is the revered ancient text in the Hindu tradition, there are numerous other ancient and medieval Sanskrit dance-drama related texts that further discuss and expand on the classical repertoire of performance arts, such as the Abhinaya Darpana, Abhinava Bharati, Natya Darpana, Bhava Prakasa and many others. The term "classical" (Sanskrit: "Shastriya") denotes the ancient Indian Shastra-based performing arts.

The text Natya Shastra describes religious arts as a form as margi, or a "spiritual traditional path" that liberates the soul, while the folk entertainment is called desi, or a "regional popular practice".

Indian classical dances are traditionally performed as an expressive drama-dance form of religious performance art, related to Vaishnavism, Shaivism, Shaktism, pan-Hindu Epics and the Vedic literature, or a folksy entertainment that includes story-telling from Sanskrit or regional language plays. As a religious art, they are either performed inside the sanctum of a Hindu temple, or near it. Folksy entertainment may also be performed in temple grounds or any fairground, typically in a rural setting by travelling troupes of artists; alternatively, they have been performed inside the halls of royal courts or public squares during festivals.

However, this is not the case for Kathak, Manipuri and Chhau as it has their own uniqueness. Kathak can be also performed on courtyards of mosques and had Muslim elements while Manipuri had the huyen langlon genre which focuses on combat. Like Manipuri, Chhau also had elements on combat.

Dance forms 
The Natya Shastra mentions four Pravrittis (traditions, genres) of ancient dance-drama in vogue when it was composed – Avanti (Ujjain, central), Dakshinatya (south), Panchali (north, west) and Odra-Magadhi (east).

Sources differ in their list of Indian classical dance forms. Encyclopædia Britannica mentions six dances. The Sangeet Natak Akademi has given recognition to eight Indian dances. The Indian government's Ministry of Culture includes nine dance forms. Scholars such as Drid Williams and others include Yaksagana and Bhagavata Mela to the nine classical Indian dances in the Sangeet Natak Akademi list.

The classical dance forms recognised by the Sangeet Natak Akademi and the Ministry of Culture are:

Classical dances recognised by the Sangeet Natak Akademi and the Ministry of Culture 
 Bharatanatyam, from Tamil Nadu
 Kathak, from Uttar Pradesh
 Kathakali, from Kerala
 Kuchipudi, from Andhra Pradesh
 Manipuri, from Manipur
 Mohiniyattam, from Kerala
 Odissi, from Odisha
 Sattriya, from Assam

Other dances also recognised by the Ministry of Culture 
 Chhau, from Eastern India (Odisha, Jharkhand, and West Bengal)

Gallery 

some of the famous Indian classical dancers are : 
 Bharatanatyam - Rukmini Devi, Padma Subrahmanyam, Vyjayanthimala, Sheema Kermani, Padmini, etc.
 Kathak - Birju Maharaj, Nahid Siddiqui, Lacchu Maharaj, Gopi Krishna, Saswati Sen, Manjari Chaturvedi etc.
 Kathakali - Kalamandalam Krishnan Nair, etc.
 Kuchipudi - Mallika Sarabhai, V. Satyanarayana Sarma, Deepa Shashindran, etc.
 Manipuri - Guru Bipin Singh, Darshana Jhaveri, Jhaveri Sisters, Devjani Chaliha, Amala Shankar
 Mohiniyattam - Kalamandalam Kalyanikutty Amma, Shobhana, Sunanda Nair, Kalamandalam Radhika, Thankamani, Kalamandalam Hymavathy
 Odissi - Sujata Mohapatra, Madhavi Mudgal, Kelucharan Mohapatra, Surendra Nath Jena, Shobana Sahajananan,Minati Mishra

Shared aspects 
All major classical Indian dance forms include in repertoire, three categories of performance in the Natya Shastra. These are Nritta, Nritya and Natya:

 The Nritta performance is an abstract, fast and rhythmic aspect of the dance. The viewer is presented with pure movement, wherein the emphasis is the beauty in motion, form, speed, range and pattern. This part of the repertoire has no interpretative aspect, no telling of the story. It is a technical performance, and aims to engage the senses (Prakriti) of the audience.
 The Nritya is slower and expressive aspect of the dance that attempts to communicate feelings, storyline particularly with spiritual themes in Hindu dance traditions. In a Nritya, the dance-acting expands to include silent expression of words through gestures and body motion set to musical notes. The actor articulates a legend or a spiritual message. This part of the repertoire is more than sensory enjoyment, it aims to engage the emotions and mind of the viewer.
 The Natyam is a play, typically a team performance, but can be acted out by a solo performer where the dancer uses certain standardized body movements to indicate a new character in the underlying story. A Natya incorporates the elements of a Nritya.

All classical dances of India used similar symbolism and rules of gestures in abhinaya (acting). The roots of abhinaya are found in the Natyashastra text which defines drama in verse 6.10 as that which aesthetically arouses joy in the spectator, through the medium of actor's art of communication, that helps connect and transport the individual into a super sensual inner state of being. A performance art, asserts Natyashastra, connects the artists and the audience through abhinaya (literally, "carrying to the spectators"), that is applying body-speech-mind and scene, wherein the actors communicate to the audience, through song and music. Drama in this ancient Sanskrit text, this is an art to engage every aspect of life, to glorify and gift a state of joyful consciousness.

The communication through symbols is in the form of expressive gestures (mudras or hastas) and pantomime set to music. The gestures and facial expressions convey the ras (sentiment, emotional taste) and bhava (mood) of the underlying story. In Hindu classical dances, the artist successfully expresses the spiritual ideas by paying attention to four aspects of a performance:
 Angika (gestures and body language),
 Vachika (song, recitation, music and rhythm),
 Aharya (stage setting, costume, make up, jewelry),
 Sattvika (artist's mental disposition and emotional connection with the story and audience, wherein the artist's inner and outer state resonates).
 Abhinaya draws out the bhava (mood, psychological states).

See also 

 Culture of India
 Hindu texts
 Languages of India
 Puranas
 Vedas
 Yajna

Footnotes

References

Bibliography 
 
 
 
 
 
 
 
 
 
 , Table of Contents
 
 
 
 
 
 Revealing the Art of Natyasastra by Narayanan Chittoor Namboodiripad 
 
Aryan Sing (2021) Guide to Indias History New Forest High School

External links

!
Sacred dance
Hindu art